The Type 31 frigate or Inspiration class, and formerly known as the Type 31e frigate or General Purpose Frigate (GPF), is a planned class of frigate intended to enter service with the United Kingdom's Royal Navy in the 2020s alongside the submarine-hunting Type 26 frigate. Designed by Babcock International, it is also marketed under the name Arrowhead 140 and is based on Odense Maritime Technology’s (OMT)  frigate hull.

It is intended that the Type 31 frigate will replace some of the general-purpose Type 23 frigates. The Type 31 is part of the British government's "National Shipbuilding Strategy".

Development
The 2010 Strategic Defence and Security Review (SDSR) authorised the Global Combat Ship (GCS) programme which would replace the Royal Navy's thirteen Type 23 frigates. Earlier that year, BAE Systems was awarded a four-year, £127 million contract by the Ministry of Defence to design the new class. It was planned that two variants of the class would be built: five general purpose frigates and eight anti-submarine warfare frigates. There was to be little difference between the two variants, except for the Sonar 2087. Initial expectations were that construction would start in 2016 and the ships would gradually replace the Type 23 frigates by the mid-2030s. The 2015 Defence Review decided that only the eight anti-submarine warfare Type 26 frigates would be ordered and five general purpose frigates to an altogether different design would be ordered to give at least 13 frigates in RN service.

General Purpose Frigate
The resultant General Purpose Frigate (GPFF) was to be a lighter, flexible and more affordable general purpose frigate class. According to the 2015 SDSR, the lower cost of these frigates could lead to the Royal Navy acquiring more than five, therefore increasing its overall numbers of frigates and destroyers. During a defence and security lecture in July 2016, GPFF was referred to as the Type 31 frigate by the First Sea Lord, Admiral Sir Philip Jones,. who also stated that Type 31 frigates could permanently operate "East of Suez"; from the Persian Gulf region to the Asia-Pacific. During the same month, BAE Systems revealed two general purpose frigate designs: the "Avenger class" which was based on the "Amazonas-class/River-class Batch 2 offshore patrol vessel" and the "Cutlass class" that was described as a "significantly stretched and enhanced derivation of the Al Shamikh-class corvette design".  The Sunday Times stated that Babcock International and BMT had also submitted one design each.

National Shipbuilding Strategy
In October 2017 the Financial Times stated that "..officials inside the Ministry of Defence, the Treasury and Royal Navy have long resented the obligation, set a decade ago, to maintain skills and shipbuilding capacity at BAE's shipyards on the Clyde regardless of naval needs." It quoted Francis Tusa, a defence analyst, who argued that the competition appeared to be designed to break BAE's hold on naval shipbuilding; "Were they to have bid as BAE Systems, they wouldn't win. That is absolutely obvious. The fact is that the Type 31 is slanted probably to exclude any bid that includes BAE." However, this was denied by the MoD which stated that the competition was designed to improve speed of delivery and reduce cost.

In order to maintain national shipbuilding capacity, the 2017 national shipbuilding strategy proposed ordering an initial batch of five Type 31e frigates with an initial in-service date in 2023, with their cost limited to a maximum of £250m each, to be followed by a second batch order of Type 31 for the Royal Navy. The Type 31 is projected to be built in modular form as with the  carriers at several commercial shipyards, and assembled in one central yard.

Design tenders
Throughout 2017 several designs from different companies were suggested as contenders for the Type 31. BAE submitted two designs, "Avenger", essentially an improved Batch 3 River-class OPV, and "Cutlass", a significantly stretched and enhanced derivation of the Al Shamikh-class corvette. BMT submitted a design called "Venator 110", with Steller Systems putting forward project "Spartan" and Babcock offered a design named "Arrowhead 120".

In October 2017, BAE Systems announced that it would withdraw from the Type 31e competition as a main contractor, citing the capacity constraints of its shipyards on the Clyde, which were full with the work on the new s and Type 26 frigates. Instead, BAE announced a partnership with Cammell Laird, whereby BAE would provide its expertise in design and systems integration, while Cammell Laird would be the prime contractor and be responsible for the assembly of the ships at its yard at Birkenhead. The planned design was named "Leander", a reference to three previous classes of ship in the Royal Navy.

In November 2017, it was announced that BMT and Babcock signed a co-operation agreement for the Type 31. They did not choose between their respective "Venator 110" or "Arrowhead 120" designs, but instead would explore their designs to determine the best possible option. In late May 2018, Babcock, partnered with BMT and Thales Group announced the "Arrowhead 140" design, based on the hull of the Danish s.

The competition was suspended on 20 July 2018 due to 'insufficient compliant bids' being received, however The Times claimed this was due to a "funding crisis". The competition was restarted in August 2018.

Competitive Design Phase selection

On 10 December 2018, three groups were selected for the competitive design phase: 
 BAE Systems/Cammell Laird with their planned Leander design
 Babcock/BMT/Thales with their Arrowhead 140 design
 Atlas Elektronik UK/ThyssenKrupp Marine Systems, which was likely to be based on the MEKO A-200 design

Both the BAE Systems and Babcock led entrants had already been put forward when the competition was temporarily suspended. The third bid was submitted by the Atlas Elektronik UK-led team. Both the Babcock and Atlas proposals included Ferguson Marine on the Clyde and Harland & Wolff in Belfast. By August 2019 both of these companies announced that they were in financial difficulties.

It was announced on 12 September 2019 that the Arrowhead 140 design had been selected for the Type 31 frigate. A contract was formally awarded to Babcock on 15 November 2019, for an average production cost of £250 million per ship and an overall programme cost set to be £2 billion with £1.25 billion value to Babcock.

On 20 January 2020, the Public Accounts Committee was informed by the Permanent Secretary for Defence that the first ship will be launched by 2023 but the in-service date will be in 2027. This is in contrast to earlier statements that the in-service date would be in 2023. In September 2022, John Howie, chief corporate affairs officer for Babcock International, stated that all five ships would be "delivered" to the Navy by 2028, though other sources suggested that the actual "in service" date might be somewhat later.

Characteristics
During a July 2016 Defence Select Committee hearing, First Sea Lord Admiral Sir Philip Jones described the GPFF as "to be a much less high-end ship. It is still a complex warship, and it is still able to protect and defend and to exert influence around the world, but it is deliberately shaped with lessons from wider industry and off-the-shelf technology to make it... more appealing to operate at a slightly lower end of Royal Navy operations." IHS Janes described it as a "credible frigate" that will cover "maritime security, maritime counter-terrorism and counter-piracy operations, escort duties, and naval fire support... [sitting] between the high-end capability delivered by the Type 26 and Type 45, and the constabulary-oriented outputs to be delivered by the five River-class Batch 2 OPVs."

A September 2017 graphic released by the Royal Navy stressed modular adaptability and flexible construction of the design for export opportunities. Core requirements of the Type 31e frigate include a medium calibre gun, point defence systems, hangar and a flight deck for Wildcat or ten tonne helicopter operated by a crew of around 100 with space for 40 more personnel. The British government released a Request for information (RFI) in September 2017, detailing the desired characteristics of the Type 31e. Forces News reported that the design will contain Sea Ceptor missiles, an advanced air and surface surveillance and target indication radar such as the Thales NS100 and be able to operate either an AgustaWestland Wildcat HMA2 or an AgustaWestland Merlin HM2. Other sources suggested that the ship may possess only a limited air defence capability, centred on an eight-cell Sea Ceptor SAM battery, but perhaps incorporating anti-ship Naval Strike Missiles which may migrate from retiring Type 23 frigates and be fitted on the Type 31. Whatever its missile armament, on 1 October 2020, BAE Systems announced it was under contract to supply five Bofors 57 Mk3 medium calibre guns and ten Bofors 40 Mk4 small calibre guns to the Royal Navy for the first five Type 31 frigates.

On 2 November 2021, First Sea Lord Tony Radakin stated that Type 31 frigates will be fitted for but not with the Mark 41 Vertical Launching System.

Exports
On 30 June 2021, it was reported that Babcock was in discussions with Greece, Indonesia, Poland and two other countries about potential Type 31 contracts.

On 16 September 2021, Babcock announced that it had signed an agreement with PT PAL Indonesia allowing it to design two Type 31 derivatives for the Indonesian Navy. The class are known locally as "Red White Frigate" (Fregat Merah Putih). The first steel cut of the first Red White frigate were done on 9 December 2022.

On 4 March 2022, Babcock announced that it won the Polish frigate competition. The Polish Armaments Agency selected Babcock’s Arrowhead 140 (AH140) from three different platform design proposals provided by the PGZ-MIECZNIK Consortium.

Ships of the class
Together, the five ships will be known as the "Inspiration class". In May 2021, the names of the five Type 31 ships were announced by the First Sea Lord; these were selected to represent key themes of the future plans of the Royal Navy and Royal Marines:

Active, named after the Type 21 frigate which served in the Falklands War and in support of Britain’s Overseas Territories, symbolising forward deployment of ships overseas.  
Bulldog, named after the World War II  , which escorted shipping convoys in the Atlantic, was chosen to represent operations in the North Atlantic.
Formidable, named after the World War II-era aircraft carrier , represents carrier operations. Formidable took part in the war in the Mediterranean, Atlantic and Pacific.  
Venturer, named after the World War II submarine , which while underwater, destroyed an enemy submarine, symbolising technology and innovation.  
Campbeltown, named after , which was involved in the daring St Nazaire raid was chosen to symbolize the Future Commando Force.

As of 2021, all ships are planned to be service by February 2030.

List of ships

See also

 Future of the Royal Navy
 Frégate de défense et d'intervention - equivalent French frigate

References

Bibliography

Frigate classes
Future Surface Combatant
Ship classes of the Royal Navy
United Kingdom defence procurement